Pavel Oganezovich Arsenov (1936 — 1999) was a  Soviet and Russian film actor, screenwriter and film director. Honored Artist of the Russian Federation (1996).

Biography
Pavel was born on January 5, 1936, in Tiflis. He studied at the Institute of Geological Survey, he graduated from the directing department of VGIK (1963, workshop of Grigori Roshal).

Before studying at VGIK, he worked at the Kartuli Pilmi, the Moscow studio of popular science films. He acted in a number of films of the studio Armenfilm, in particular, in the film  (director Yuri Yerzinkyan).

Since 1962 director of the Gorky Film Studio. A vivid event was the avant-garde  film King Stag. The greatest popularity to film director Pavel Arsenov was brought by the 5-serial children's television movie Guest from the Future, which appeared on screens in March 1985. After that, Alisa Seleznyova's film character, created by Arsenov and embodied on the screen of a 12-year-old Moscow schoolgirl Natasha Guseva, became cult for millions of Soviet schoolchildren.

Died August 12, 1999, in Moscow. He was buried at the Shcherbinskoye Cemetery in Moscow.

Filmography
 1963 — Sunflower (short)
 1966 — Lyolka (short)
 1967 — Save the Drowning Man
 1969 — King Stag
 1973 — And then I Said No ...
 1975 — Taste of Halva
 1977 — Confusion of Feelings
 1978 — Hello, River (together with Yuri Grigoriev and Igor Yasulovich)
 1979 — Do Not Part with Your Beloved
 1985 — Guest from the Future
 1985 — Lilac Ball
 1994 — The Wizard of the Emerald City

Personal life
The first wife (from 1963 to 1969) was actress Valentina Malyavina. The second wife (since 1976) — Elena Arsenova. Daughter Elizaveta (born 1980) works as a make-up stylist in Moscow theaters.

References

External links 
 
 
 Фотографии со съёмок фильмов Павла Арсенова

1936 births
Actors from Tbilisi
1999 deaths
Soviet film directors
Russian film directors
Soviet screenwriters
Male screenwriters
Soviet male film actors
Gerasimov Institute of Cinematography alumni
Russian people of Armenian descent
Science fiction film directors
20th-century screenwriters
Film people from Tbilisi